Jonathan Barnett Kaye (December 12, 1945  – August 18, 2002), known as Jonnie Barnett, was an American musician. In the 1970s, he performed as an opening act for several acts such as Tom Waits, Cheech and Chong, and Frank Zappa. He also made appearances in the 1975 film Nashville, and in Cheech and Chong's Next Movie.

One of Barnett's compositions, "One Foot in the Blues", was recorded by Johnny Adams and received a Blues Song of the Year award from 1997 W. C. Handy Blues Awards. Barnett also wrote a short story entitled "The Chain of Love" which appeared in the book Chicken Soup for the Country Soul. He and songwriter Rory Lee Feek later adapted this story into the song "The Chain of Love", which was a Top 5 country hit for Clay Walker in 2000. The song was based on a real-life event.

Barnett died of a stroke at the age of 56, on August 18, 2002, in Nashville.

References 

1946 births
2002 deaths
American country rock singers
American country singer-songwriters
American male singer-songwriters
20th-century American musicians
20th-century American singers
Country musicians from South Carolina
20th-century American male singers
Singer-songwriters from South Carolina